The Muravey-class is the NATO reporting name for a class of hydrofoil patrol boats built for the Soviet Navy between 1983 and 1989. The Soviet designation was Project 133 Antares.

Design
The boats were designed as patrol vessels and were built in Feodosiya for the Black Sea Fleet. They are powered by gas turbines in contrast to diesel engines used for most other Soviet fast attack craft to achieve higher speeds.

Ships
16 boats were built for the Soviet Navy between 1983 and 1989

 10? are believed to be operated by the Russian Border guard
 3 are believed to be operated by the Ukrainian Sea Guard

Variants
 Project 133: basic hydrofoil
 Project 133RA "Antares RA": stealth version, similar to Visby class, but (around) half the size

See also
List of ships of the Soviet Navy
List of ships of Russia by project number

References
 Also published as 
Page in Russian Language

Ships of the Soviet Navy
Patrol boat classes
Hydrofoils